Patrick Andrew Spencer is an American professional basketball player for the Santa Cruz Warriors of the NBA G League. He is also a former college lacrosse player for the Loyola Greyhounds.

High school career
Spencer attended Boys' Latin School of Maryland, where he lettered in both lacrosse and basketball. As a senior, he averaged 14.3 points, 8.1 rebounds, 6.1 assists and 2.3 steals per game.Boby Shriver was Pat Spencer's coach at Boy's Latin School of Maryland. In his sophomore year he was 5-foot-6 playing on the junior varsity lacrosse. In his junior year, he grew to be 6-foot-2, 190 pounds and played on varsity lacrosse. His hometown was Davidsonville, Md. In high school, he took USLacrosse Highschool All American. He earned four varsity letters for basketball and lacrosse. He also played for the Under Armour Underclass All-American team Baltimore in 2014. He scored 49 goals and had 51 assists as a senior and 30 goals  and 30 assists as a junior.

College career

Lacrosse
During Spencer's four years at Loyola, the team compiled a record of 49 wins and 19 losses, with the 2016 squad compiling a 14–4 record and reaching the NCAA Final Four.

Spencer holds the NCAA Division I record for career assists with 231 assists, as well as the Patriot League record for career points with 380. Spencer received the Lt. Raymond Enners Award as the USILA national player of the year and the Jack Turnbull Award as the nation's top attackman in 2019. Spencer also received the Tewaaraton Award, regarded as the Heisman Trophy for NCAA DI lacrosse, as a junior.

As a senior on attack he also ranked No.2 on all-time points list behind Lyle Thompson. He was a four time All-American and first Patriot League Men's Lacrosse player to receive the Tewaaraton award. At Loyola, his head coach was Charley Toomey. In his first two collegiate games he scored 8 combined points in wins over Virginia and Johns Hopkins University. In 2016 her took league first team honoree for rookie of the year trophy. He graduated from Loyola with a Bachelor of Business Finance.

In an interview hosted Paul Carcaterra, an ESPN lacrosse game analyst and sideline reporter, Carcaterra talked to Pat Spencer about college lacrosse and his background in basketball. Paul asks, "How big of an impact has hoops had on your lacrosse career". Pat responded, "Definitely a big impact, I think anytime you play another sport a lot of it translates over". Later in the video, when Paul and Pat were shooting hoops, Spencer added, "Basketball and lacrosse are very similar, in terms of facing and trying to draw a guy and find your open teammates".

Basketball
Spencer used his college graduate year eligibility to play basketball at Northwestern University. He averaged 10.4 points, 4.1 rebounds, and 3.9 assists per game.

Professional career

Hamburg Towers (2021) 
When the remainder of his grad season at Northwestern was canceled due to the COVID-19 pandemic, Spencer joined the Hamburg Towers in Germany.

Capital City Go-Go (2021–2022) 
On October 25, 2021, Spencer signed with the Capital City Go-Go of the NBA G League.

Santa Cruz Warriors (2022–present)
On July 25, 2022, Spencer signed an Exhibit 10 contract with the Golden State Warriors.

On October 24, 2022, Spencer joined the Santa Cruz Warriors training camp roster.

Statistics

NCAA Basketball

Loyola University Lacrosse

(a) 
(b) 1st in Division I career assists
(c) 4th in Division I career points

See also
2016 NCAA Division I Men's Lacrosse Championship
Loyola Greyhounds men's lacrosse
Division I men's lacrosse records

References

External links
Loyola Greyhounds bio
Northwestern Wildcats bio
Pat Spencer at RealGM

Living people
1996 births
American lacrosse players
Loyola Greyhounds men's lacrosse players
Northwestern Wildcats men's basketball players
Capital City Go-Go players
Hamburg Towers players
Basketball players from Baltimore
Lacrosse players from Baltimore
Sportspeople from Anne Arundel County, Maryland
American expatriate basketball people in Germany